Pelseneer Island is an island  long and  wide, with three prominent rocky peaks projecting through its icecap, lying  northeast of O'Neal Point and  west of Brooklyn Island in the south-central portion of Wilhelmina Bay, off the west coast of Graham Land. Discovered by the Belgian Antarctic Expedition, 1897–99, and named by Gerlache for P. Pelseneer, member of the Belgica Commission and writer of some of the zoological reports of the expedition.

See also 
 List of Antarctic and sub-Antarctic islands

Islands of Graham Land
Danco Coast